Coiner House, also known as Koyner House and Koiner House, is a historic home located near Crimora, Augusta County, Virginia. It was built about 1825, and is a two-story, three-bay brick "I-house", with an original one-story kitchen wing. Attached to the kitchen wing is a two-story, frame ell dated to the early 20th century.  The interior features colorful graining, marbleizing, and polychromy, as well as elaborate provincial woodwork.  Also on the property are a contributing late-19th century bank barn and mid-19th century dairy.

It was listed on the National Register of Historic Places in 1978.

References

Houses on the National Register of Historic Places in Virginia
Houses completed in 1825
Houses in Augusta County, Virginia
National Register of Historic Places in Augusta County, Virginia
1825 establishments in Virginia